Write Your Own History is a compilation of B-sides and previously unreleased material by the Sunderland band Field Music.

The album was well received, receiving a 7/10 from The Guardian and praise from publications such as The Times.

Track listing
 "You're Not Supposed To" – 2:37 (2005)
 "In the Kitchen" – 3:41 (2003)
 "Trying to Sit Out" – 1:48 (2003)
 "Breakfast Song" – 1:49 (2003)
 "Feeding the Birds" – 2:11 (2003)
 "Test Your Reaction" – 4:08 (2002)
 "I'm Tired" – 2:47 (2002)
 "Alternating Current" – 3:08 (2002)
 "Can You See Anything?" – 3:20 (2000)

Personnel
Peter Brewis
David Brewis
Andrew Moore
Emma Fisk
Laura Staniland
Peter Richardson
Michael Kershaw
Kenny Kirsop
Barry Hyde of The Futureheads – guitars
David Hyde of The Futureheads – drums

You're Not Supposed To
The album opener, "You're Not Supposed To", was later released as a single with a video depicting the band performing in a Northern England pub as the patrons form a large conga line and some join in playing instruments with the band. The single features a typographical cover similar to that of the album, but with larger text displaying the lyrics to the song rather than information on the band's history.

 "You're Not Supposed To" – 2:37
 "You're Not Supposed To" (The Matinee Orchestra Remix) – 3:26
 "You're Not Supposed To" (video) – 2:33

References

2006 compilation albums
Field Music albums
Memphis Industries albums